Breath of life may refer to:

Medicine and philosophy 
 Prana, or life force, in Vedantic philosophy
 Pneuma (Stoic), in Stoic philosophy
 Pneuma (ancient medicine)
 A concept in biodynamic osteopathy and craniosacral therapy

Film 
 Breath of Life (1962 film), a 1962 British crime film
 Breath of Life (1990 film), a 1990 Italian drama film
 Breath of Life (1991 film), a 1991 British short film

Literature 
 The Breath of Life (play), a 2002 play by David Hare
 A Breath of Life, a novel by Brazilian author Clarice Lispector

Music 
 "Breath of Life" (Erasure song), a 1991 song by Erasure, released as a single in 1992
 "Breath of Life" (Florence and the Machine song), a 2012 song by Florence and the Machine
 Breath of Life (Louis Hayes album), 1974
 Breath of Life (Magnum album), 2002
 Breath of Life (World Saxophone Quartet album), 1994
 "Breath of Life", a song from The Lord of the Rings: The Two Towers, sung in an Elvish language
 The Breath of Life (band), a dark wave and gothic rock band from Belgium
 The Breath of Life music festival, held in early 2012 in Tasmania

Other uses 
 Breath of Life (language restoration workshops), in Native American communities

See also 
 Pneuma (disambiguation)